Buldoo (Scottish Gaelic:) in the far north of Scotland,  is a small hamlet 0.5 miles south of Dounreay in Thurso, Caithness, Scottish Highlands and is in the Scottish council area of Highland.

References

Populated places in Caithness